Real Ones, also known as Reelones, is a Folk/rock band from Bergen, Norway. The band was formed in 1994. Band members include Ivar Vogt (vocals, guitar, ukulele, saxophone), Jørgen Sandvik (vocals, guitar, banjo, sitar), Kåre Opheim (drums, backing vocals), Øystein Skjælaaen (bass, backing vocals), and David Vogt (vocals, violin, organ). 1994-2009 Yrjan Tangenes provided vocals, percussion, and bodhrán, and Thomas Lønnheim played percussion in 1999-2000. The band was formed when Vogt and Sandvik were 14 and 15 years of age.

Biography 

The ensemble, who normally sing English lyrics, makes music that can be characterized as folk-rock or melodic pop, but is also influenced by psychedelia and oriental music. According to a review by VG represents plate Home with the Girls in the Morning a result that is "... a beautiful, cohesive and melodic album of the rustic, organic and harmonic variety. Real Ones writes beautiful and atmospheric songs full of gorgeous instrumental detail."

On opening night at the Kongsberg Jazzfestival in 2005, the band played together on the same stage with the singer Ole Paus. The band received the 2008 Spellemannprisen for Best Pop Album for All for the Neighbourhood. Palm Sunday 2015 Real Ones accompanied by Sigbjørn Apeland, performed the Misa Criolla at Voss Church during the Vossajazz festival.

Honors 
2008: Spellemannprisen in the category Pop music, for the album All for the Neighbourhood
2013: Spellemannprisen in the category Pop music, for the album Tonight Only Tonight / The Morning After

Discography 
1997: Comments From the Cheap Seats (New Records)
2002: Bratislava EP (New Records) (Reached 14th place on the charts)
2003: This is Camping (New Records)
2005: Home With the Girls in the Morning (Breaking Records)
2008: All for the Neighbourhood (Warner Music)
2009: Ekko (Instrumental Opus 1) (Warner Music )
2011: First Night on Earth (Warner Music)
2012: Real Ones & The Extended Family (Breaking Records)
2013: Tonight Only Tonight / The Morning After (Warner Music)
2014: Misa Criolla (Breaking Records)

2018: Hey Future, Hey Past (Breaking Records)

References

External links 

Norwegian pop music groups
Norwegian folk rock groups
Spellemannprisen winners
Musical groups established in 1994
1994 establishments in Norway
Musical groups from Bergen